Dilshod Mansurov (born December 12, 1983 in Tashkent) is a male freestyle wrestler from Uzbekistan.  He participated in Men's freestyle 55 kg at 2008 Summer Olympics. He earned 4th place after losing the bronze medal fight with Besik Kudukhov.

Mansurov also participated in 2004 Summer Olympics where he was ranked 10th and the 2012 Summer Olympics where he was 14th.

He is a winner of 2003 and 2005 FILA Wrestling World Championships (Men's freestyle 55 kg).

Mansurov won gold medals at 2002 Asian Games and 2006 Asian Games and 2010 Asian Games.

References

External links
 Wrestler profile on beijing2008.com

Living people
1983 births
Sportspeople from Tashkent
Olympic wrestlers of Uzbekistan
Wrestlers at the 2008 Summer Olympics
Wrestlers at the 2004 Summer Olympics
Wrestlers at the 2012 Summer Olympics
Asian Games medalists in wrestling
Wrestlers at the 2002 Asian Games
Wrestlers at the 2006 Asian Games
Wrestlers at the 2010 Asian Games
World Wrestling Championships medalists
Uzbekistani male sport wrestlers
Asian Games gold medalists for Uzbekistan
Medalists at the 2002 Asian Games
Medalists at the 2006 Asian Games
Medalists at the 2010 Asian Games
World Wrestling Champions